Osterwieck-Fallstein was a Verwaltungsgemeinschaft ("collective municipality") in the district of Harz, in Saxony-Anhalt, Germany. It was situated north of the Harz, and north of Wernigerode. The seat of the Verwaltungsgemeinschaft was in Osterwieck. It was disbanded on 1 January 2010.

The Verwaltungsgemeinschaft Osterwieck-Fallstein consisted of the following municipalities:

 Aue-Fallstein 
 Berßel 
 Bühne 
 Lüttgenrode 
 Osterwieck
 Rhoden 
 Schauen 
 Wülperode

References

Former Verwaltungsgemeinschaften in Saxony-Anhalt